The Surgical Care and Outcomes Assessment Program (SCOAP) is a clinician-led, performance benchmarking and quality improvement (QI) registry for surgical and interventional procedures.

SCOAP was established in 2005 through a grassroots effort of Washington State's surgical community led by David Flum, MD, MPH, and the state chapter of the American College of Surgeons. SCOAP is administered by the Foundation for Health Care Quality (FHCQ), a non-profit organization serving as ‘‘safe-harbor’’ for the multiple groups involved in healthcare improvement projects in Washington State.

In 2009, SCOAP rolled out its most visible initiative—the Surgical Checklist. Modeled after the checklist used by pilots on commercial airlines, this checklist is now in every Washington State hospital. This list assures the entire surgical team reviews each step in the upcoming surgery at the same time and prior to the surgery itself. The checklist initiative was widely implemented and received support from Washington State governor, Christine Gregoire.

SCOAP data exchange is protected by the WA State Continuous Quality Improvement Program statute.  As a Washington State approved Coordinated Quality Improvement Program, SCOAP's participating hospitals are allowed to disclose protected healthcare information specifically for program purposes. Hospitals hire and train staff to review medical records and abstract clinical data using SCOAP data collection forms and data dictionaries. The clinical data are entered to the SCOAP registry using a web-based form. Participant hospitals receive quarterly QI performance reports that show their data alongside benchmarks and peer performance. The SCOAP continuous data collection and feedback loop is proven to improve the quality and safety of surgical and interventional care while decreasing costs.

There are currently five SCOAP registries: gastrointestinal/general surgical procedures, oncologic surgical procedures, pediatric surgical procedures, spine surgical procedures, and vascular surgical and interventional healthcare procedures.

Growth and development

SCOAP's growth and development was supported through grants from the Life Sciences Discovery Fund, the Agency for Healthcare Research and Quality (AHRQ) and the National Cancer Institute (NCI) to investigators in the Department of Surgery at the University of Washington (UW) under principal investigator David Flum, MD, MPH.  Current research and development using SCOAP data is supported by the UW's Comparative Effectiveness Research Translation Network (CERTAIN) within the Surgical Outcomes Research Center (SORCE). CERTAIN aims to answer patient centered  comparative effectiveness research questions across a range of clinical topic areas, most recently including; the use of interventional care for claudication, the role of antibiotics in appendicitis, the value of elective surgery for diverticulitis, the impact of non-steroidal pain medication on outcomes and the effect of hyperglycemia on surgical infections. Led by implementation research teams at the UW, SCOAP was the first to bring advanced operating room checklists to every hospital in the state in 2010. In 2012 this group helped move checklisting from the OR to the surgeon's office by creating Strong for Surgery, an initiative now run in partnership with the American College of Surgeons.

SCOAP has similarities to the American College of Surgeons  National Surgical Quality Improvement Program (ACS-NSQIP), but is more focused on directing improvements in process of care metrics along with benchmarking on risk-adjusted outcome measures.  SCOAP was also the first statewide performance surveillance to incorporate patient reported outcomes (pain and function in spine surgery) into its benchmarking.

Leadership 
Medical Director: 
 Richard C. Thirlby, MD, FACS (2015 - current)
 Ellen Thomason, MD, MPH, FACS (2012-2014)
 David R. Flum, MD, MPH, FACS (founding Medical Director, served 2005-2012)
Advisory Board:
 Michael Florence, MD (Chair)
Program Director: 
 Vickie A. Kolios-Morris, MSHSA, CPHQ (2012-current)
 Rosa Johnson (2007-2012)
 Miriam Marcus-Smith (2005-2007)

Academic publications

 
 
 
 
 
 
 
 
 The CERTAIN Collaborative. Preparing Electronic Clinical Data for Quality Improvement and Comparative Effectiveness Research: The SCOAP CERTAIN Automation and Validation Project. eGEMs. 2013 Oct; 1(1):[16].

References

External links 
 

Health care quality